David Moiseevich Khorol (February 4, 1920 — February 19, 1990) was Soviet Jewish mathematician and aviation and rocket designer, professor, doktor of technical sciences. His last position was deputy general director of the Central Design Bureau "Geophysics" (ЦКБ «Геофизика»), known for its rocket design.

Awards

For his works on design in the area of military technology David Khorol was awarded multiple state awards, including Order of Lenin (twice), Stalin Prize, Lenin Prize, USSR State Prize, title Hero of Socialist Labor.

References

1920 births
1990 deaths
Soviet mathematicians
Soviet engineers
Heroes of Socialist Labour
Recipients of the Order of Lenin